The Theory of regions is an approach for synthesizing a Petri net from a transition system. As such, it aims at recovering concurrent, independent behavior from transitions between global states. Theory of regions handles elementary net systems as well as P/T nets and other kinds of nets. An important point is that the approach is aimed at the synthesis of unlabeled Petri nets only.

Definition 

A region of a transition system  is a mapping assigning to each state  a number  (natural number for P/T nets, binary for ENS) and to each transition label a number   such that consistency conditions  holds whenever .

Intuitive explanation 

Each region represents a potential place of a Petri net.

Mukund: event/state separation property, state separation property.

References 

Set theory